No. 49 Chemical Biological Radiological Nuclear and Explosive Wing was established in 2016 at the SLAF Bandaranayake. The unit's first Commanding Officer was Squadron Leader (now Wing Commander) Nilendra Perera, who continues to hold this office. The wing is equipped with modern equipment required to counter chemical, biological, radiological, nuclear and high yield explosive threats.

History 
The unit was established in 2016 at the SLAF Bandaranayake. The No 49 Chemical Biological Radiological Nuclear and Explosive Wing came into action when a Sri Lankan Airlines aircraft took off from Bandaranike International Airport to repatriate Sri Lankan students from the Chinese province of Wuhan, affected by the novel coronavirus outbreak. The wing carried out decontamination operations of the aircraft fleet at the Bandaranayke International Airport during the COVID-19 pandemic.

Training 
Airmen are trained locally at SLAF Base Katunayake and also sent on overseas specialized training courses to countries such as Switzerland, Serbia, Norway, Bangladesh, Pakistan, the Czech Republic, South Korea, and the United States.

References

External links 
 Sri Lanka Air Force
 Sri Lanka Air Force  Base Katunayake

Sri Lanka Air Force Wings